Lars Müller (born 22 March 1976) is a German former professional footballer and  head coach of Werner SC.

Career
Müller was born in Werne. In his youth, he played for Sportfreunde Werne-West, a sports club based in his hometown, before being signed by SV 1919 Herbern. He then joined Hammer SpVg before being signed by Bundesliga club Borussia Dortmund in 1995.

He made his Bundesliga debut on 6 April 1996 in a 1–1 draw at home against Werder Bremen when he came on for Lars Ricken in the 77th minute. After only playing one game in his second year, he moved to second division KFC Uerdingen 05 where he played for three seasons and then moved to Alemannia Aachen where he played two season.

From 2001–02 to 2005–06 he played for 1. FC Nürnberg. For the 2006–07 season he moved to the 2. Bundesliga club FC Augsburg, where he became a regular player in 2008–09 season. After the end of the 2008–09 season, Müller was not a part of the plans at Augsburg under the new coach and therefore, he wasn't offered a new contract. In the summer 2009, he therefore moved to RB Leipzig.

In the summer 2011, Müller moved to Hammer SpVg as a player-head coach. After his release in November 2012, he took over the post of sporting director until the end of the season.

In June 2017, he was appointed head coach of Werner SC. As of February 2020, he was still the club's head coach.

Honours
Borussia Dortmund
 Bundesliga: 1995–96

References

External links
 

1976 births
Living people
People from Werne
Sportspeople from Arnsberg (region)
German footballers
Footballers from North Rhine-Westphalia
Association football defenders
Association football midfielders
Germany under-21 international footballers
Bundesliga players
2. Bundesliga players
Borussia Dortmund players
Borussia Dortmund II players
KFC Uerdingen 05 players
Alemannia Aachen players
1. FC Nürnberg players
FC Augsburg players
RB Leipzig players
Hammer SpVg players
German football managers